KELP-FM (89.3 MHz) is a radio station licensed to serve Mesquite, New Mexico, although the station's A-grade service contour covers almost the entire city of Las Cruces, New Mexico.  The station is owned by Sky High Broadcasting, Inc.  It airs a Christian radio format featuring a mix of local and syndicated programming.

History
The station was initially applied for by brothers Keith Leitch and Kenneth Leitch, under their non-profit organization, Sky High Broadcasting.  Keith was an intern for a local broadcast engineer in El Paso, Texas, Pete E. Meryl Warren III, the founder of KCIK-TV Channel 14 (now KFOX-TV) and KJLF-TV Channel 65 (now KTFN).  The intent was for the station to be manned by, and the programming to be provided by, Christian students at New Mexico State University, the Leitch brothers' Alma Mater.  However, broadcast stations within the U.S./Mexico border zone are subject to approval by the government of Mexico, and the Leitch brothers had left the area by the time the station was approved by the Federal Communications Commission (FCC) and Mexican authorities.  Keith Leitch also set up KORB-FM which broadcasts Christian music in the Santa Rosa, California vicinity.

Arnie McClatchey, the owner of KELP, and KROL (now KXPZ, after being sold by Mr. McClatchey and undergoing a format change), was appointed to the board of directors as the head of the board of Sky High Broadcasting, due to his expertise in Christian broadcasting in the local market, and oversaw getting the station on the air.

The station was assigned the KELP-FM call letters by the FCC on April 11, 2001.

Translators

References

External links
KELP-FM official website

ELP-FM
2011 establishments in New Mexico